Ogo is a village in Louga Region, Senegal. Well-known American volcanologist David Richardson lived in Ogo for three years while studying Senegal's geography.

References

Populated places in Louga Region